The United Kingdom Census of 1881 recorded the people residing in every household on the night of Sunday 3 April 1881, and was the fifth of the UK censuses to include details of household members.

Data recorded
Details collected include: address, name, relationship to the head of the family, marital status, age at last birthday, gender, occupation, and place of birth. As with earlier censuses, the form asked whether any "lunatics", "imbeciles" or "idiots" lived in the household, causing the Registrar General to observe that: "It is against human nature to expect a mother to admit her young child to be an idiot, however much she may fear this to be true. To acknowledge the fact is to abandon all hope."

The total population of England, Wales and Scotland was recorded as 29,707,207. 

Notable respondents included Winston Churchill, Karl Marx and Charles Darwin.

Indexing
The 1881 census was the first UK census to be indexed in its entirety. In the 1980s, in a project that has been characterised as "the largest collection of historical source material to be made available in computerised form", and "the first major 'crowd-sourced' exercise in the world", the Genealogical Society of Utah began collaborating with the Federation of Family History Societies and the Scottish Association of Family History Societies to produce an index to the 1881 census for England, Wales, Scotland, the Channel Islands and the Isle of Man.

In 1994 and 1995 the resulting index was published, county by county, on microfiche, and made available to institutions.
In 1999 the index was published on a set of 24 CD-ROMs and made available to the general public.

In August 2001 the index for Scotland was made available online on Scots Origins, then the official data site of the General Register Office for Scotland, and is now available on its successor ScotlandsPeople. In February 2003, the remaining material was made available free of charge on the FamilySearch website.
Free access to the online index is now available from several other sites, though the Scottish data remains exclusive to ScotlandsPeople.

See also
Census in the United Kingdom
List of United Kingdom censuses

References

1881
Census
April 1881 events